"Best Thing" is the first single released by the band Styx from their self-titled debut album, Styx (1972). It charted at #82 on the Billboard Hot 100.

Cash Box said that "high vocal harmonies and tight, rocky organ and lead guitar work accentuate this dynamic, searing track."

The song was also included on the 1979 US reissue of the band's fourth album, Man of Miracles

Personnel
 Dennis DeYoung – lead vocals (first and last verses), backing vocals, keyboards
 James Young – lead guitar, lead vocals (middle verses, bridge), backing vocals
 John Curulewski – rhythm guitar, backing vocals
 Chuck Panozzo – bass
 John Panozzo – drums

References

External links
 Styx - "Best Thing" (1972) song to be listened as stream at Spotify.com

1972 debut singles
Styx (band) songs
Songs written by Dennis DeYoung
1972 songs
Songs written by James Young (American musician)